AOK Baden-Württemberg is a statutory health insurance company in Baden-Württemberg.

It is the biggest health insurer in southwest Germany.

It provides a range of courses on nutrition, exercise, relaxation and stress management.

References

External links
 AOK

Baden
Health care companies of Germany